The Cricket Tunnel and Crest Tunnel are a pair of railroad tunnels in northern Arkansas, near the city of Omaha in Boone County. Both tunnels were built by the White River Division of the Missouri Pacific Railroad in the early 20th century. The tunnels were listed on the National Register of Historic Places in 2007.

Cricket Tunnel
The Cricket Tunnel is oriented roughly northwest to southeast, and passes under Old United States Route 65 south of Omaha. The southeast portal is unfinished, as its opening was excavated out of bedrock. Much of the interior of the tunnel is lined with steel and concrete, as it passes through an area of mud and watery clay.

Both tunnels were built at the same time in 1903-05 by crews of the Missouri Pacific Railroad.   Construction of the Cricket Tunnel took longer than anticipated due to the clay encountered, and by a rockslide in the tunnel in September 1904.  The concrete lining was added to the tunnel in 1906 amid concerns of continuing rockfalls, and additional work in 1916 removed the top from the southern  of the tunnel.

Crest Tunnel
The Crest Tunnel also runs in a northwest-to-southeast direction, and is located northwest of Omaha, passing under Arkansas Highway 14 east of its junction with US 65. Its northwest portal is unfinished. It is also distinctive for a curve near the southwestern portal. It is bored entirely through bedrock.

See also
National Register of Historic Places listings in Boone County, Arkansas
List of bridges on the National Register of Historic Places in Arkansas

References

Railway tunnels on the National Register of Historic Places
Tunnels completed in 1903
Historic districts on the National Register of Historic Places in Arkansas
National Register of Historic Places in Boone County, Arkansas
Railway buildings and structures on the National Register of Historic Places in Arkansas
1903 establishments in Arkansas
Missouri Pacific Railroad
Transportation in Boone County, Arkansas